Michael or Mike Trout may refer to:

 Michael Carver Trout (1810–1873), U.S. Representative from Pennsylvania
 Michael Trout (Australian politician) (born 1963), member of the Legislative Assembly of Queensland
 Mike Trout (born 1991), American Major League Baseball player